Cows in the Meadow is an oil painting created in 1883 by Vincent van Gogh. The painting was previously only known by a very poor photograph.

See also
List of works by Vincent van Gogh

References

External links

Paintings by Vincent van Gogh
1883 paintings
Cattle in art